Cuatro Caminos is a station on Line 1, Line 2 and Line 6 of the Madrid Metro, located underneath the Cuatro Caminos roundabout on the border of Chamberí and Tetuán districts in Madrid. It is located in fare Zone A. The station was inaugurated on 17 October 1919, and was opened to the public on 31 October 1919.

However, in terms of absolute elevation above sea level, it is not the lowest, as there are other Line 6 stations with platforms at a lower elevation.

History 
Cuatro Caminos is one of the first eight stations in the Madrid Metro system, opening on 17 October 1919 when King Alfonso XIII inaugurated Line 1, which initially ran from Sol to Cuatro Caminos. They are located underneath Santa Engracia street close to the roundabout. On 6 March 1929, Line 1 was extended to Cuatro Caminos to Tetuán, and as a result Cuatro Caminos was no longer a terminus.

The Line 2 platforms were inaugurated on 10 September 1929 when Line 2 was extended from Quevedo to Cuatro Caminos, making it a Line 2 terminus. The platforms are located underneath Bravo Murillo street south of the roundabout at the same depth as the Line 1 platforms.

The Line 6 platforms entered into service on 10 October 1979 when the first segment of Line 6 was inaugurated, running from Cuatro Caminos to Pacífico. On 13 January 1987, Line 6 was extended from Cuatro Caminos to Ciudad Universitaria. The platforms are the deepest in the system, and are located beneath Raimundo Fernández Villaverde street east of the roundabout.

In 2004–2005, an underpass was constructed for automotive traffic underneath the roundabout, replacing a previous overpass. The tunnel was built in the free space between Lines 1 and 2 and Line 6, which had previously been left empty in case the Metro decided to connect a fourth line to the station.

Between 3 July and 13 November 2016, Line 1 was closed for renovations between Plaza de Castilla and Sierra de Guadalupe, a segment that included Cuatro Caminos. Renovations included tunnel repairs, cleaning, and waterproofing, the installation of rigid overhead lines, and other work. Starting 14 September 2016, Cuatro Caminos was temporarily used as a terminus for Line 1 when service was reestablished between the station and Plaza de la Castilla. Line 1 service was fully restored on 13 November.

References 

Line 1 (Madrid Metro) stations
Line 2 (Madrid Metro) stations
Line 6 (Madrid Metro) stations
Railway stations in Spain opened in 1919